Giovanni Filippo Criscuolo (c. 1500–1584) was  an Italian painter, active during the late-Renaissance period, mainly in Naples.

Born in Gaeta, He trained with  Andrea da Salerno and with Perino del Vaga in Rome. His brother Giovanni Angelico and daughter Mariangiola were also painters. He apparently wrote a series of biographies of Neapolitan painters. In Naples, he painted a Adoration of the Magi in Santa Maria del Rosario. In Santa Maria delle Grazie, he painted a Madonna and Child. In San Lorenzo, he painted a Christ bearing his Cross. He also left paintings in Gaeta. One of his pupils was Francesco Curia. His brother, Gian Angelo, (Cosenza, 1500–1573) was also a painter.

References

16th-century Italian painters
Italian male painters
Italian Renaissance painters
Painters from Naples
People from Gaeta
1500s births
1584 deaths